Rewa Harriman (née Hudson; born 15 September 1980) is a retired New Zealand female tennis player.

Hudson has won seven doubles titles on the ITF circuit in her career. On 16 February 1998, she reached her best singles ranking of world number 318. On 7 December 1998, she peaked at world number 293 in the doubles rankings.

Rewa Hudson retired from tennis 2001.

Playing for New Zealand at the Fed Cup, Hudson has a win–loss record of 8–10.

Junior Grand Slam finals

Doubles: 1 (0–1)

ITF finals (7–3)

Singles (0–2)

Doubles (7–1)

Fed Cup participation

Singles

Doubles

ITF junior results

Singles (2/1)

Doubles (5/5)

References

External links 
 
 

1980 births
Living people
New Zealand female tennis players